Gorontalo or Hulondalo people are the native people of the northern part of Sulawesi. They are the most populous ethnicity in the Minahasa Peninsula. The Gorontalo people are predominantly Muslim. Their native language is the Gorontalo language. The Gorontalo people have traditionally been concentrated in the provinces of Gorontalo, North Sulawesi, and the northern part of Central Sulawesi.

Etymology
The name Gorontalo probably derives from many terms, such as:

 Hulontalangio, the name of a tribe which lives in an area
 Hua Lolontalango, means a cave used for two-way travel
 Hulutalangi, means noble
 Huluo lo Tola, means a place where snakehead fish reproduces
 Pongolatalo or Pohulatalo, means a waiting place
 Gunung Telu, means the third mountain
 Hunto, means a place always flowed with water

Gorontalo people sometime refer themselves as Hulandalo or Hulantalo, a well-known term in Gorontalo and North Sulawesi, which usually refer to the region of Gorontalo or the native people from Gorontalo.

The Gorontalo people also have a family kinship system called Pohala'a. This system is a heritage of the kingdoms that had previously established in Gorontalo. There are five pohala'a in Gorontalo, namely Gorontalo, Limboto, Suwawa, Bualemo and Atinggola; where the Gorontalo pohala'a is the most prominent among the pohala'as.

History

Origins
The origins of the Gorontalo people is uncertain. There are two Southeast Asian migration theories, with the first theory states that the population of Southeast Asian originally came from the east, and then inhabited in Sulawesi. While the second theory explains that the human migration began from Taiwan and arrived in Sulawesi through the Philippines. Linguistically, Gorontalo people share the same origins with other Austronesian people of the Philippine Islands and North Sulawesi islands.

There is a Gorontalo legend that tells a story that they are the descendants of Hulontalangi, or the people that came from the skies and reside on Mount Tilongkabila, Bone Bolango Regency. The name Hulontalangi then became Hulontalo and Gorontalo.

Pre-historic period
According to legend, the first Gorontalo kingdom emerged at the beginning of the 2nd millennium BC. Gorontalo is believed to have inhabited by humans since prehistoric times. The Oluhuta site in Bone Bolango Regency is an archaeology site which provides information about the tombs of previous communities that were estimated to have lived around 2000–4000 years ago.

Gorontalo kingdoms
The establishment of the Gorontalo region have been estimated to formed 400 years ago. Gorontalo is one of the places that are recognized for the spreading of Islam in East Indonesia besides Ternate and Bone state. By 1525, when the Portuguese arrived at North Sulawesi, Islam had already been widely spread among them during the rule of King Amay; with the Gorontalo lands divided between the Muslim states of Gorontalo, Limboto, Suwawa, Boalemo and Atinggola. Gorontalo then developed to become the center of education and trade in North Sulawesi. The city of the Gorontalo Kingdom first began in Hulawa village beside the Bolango River. Before the arrival of the Europeans, the kingdoms in Gorontalo have already adhered to a family bonding system called pohala'a, which is still found today.

Dutch East India Company period
Prior to the arrival of the Europeans, the Gorontalo kingdoms were under the influence of the Ternate Sultanate. Gorontalo came under the administrative region of the Dutch East India Company with the formation of Gorontalo Regency as a result of a treaty between Governor Ternate Robertus Patbrugge and the Gorontalo king.

During the Dutch East Indies period, Gorontalo people began to emigrate out of Gorontalo region in the 18th century; to other regions such as Ternate, Ambon Island, Buol Island, Banggai Island and Minahasa Regency, in order to avoid the forced labor system that was enforced by the Dutch East Indies government in Gorontalo at that time.

There were military-political alliance, which by the end of the 19th century they were fully colonized by the Dutch East Indies. In 1950 Gorontalo as a part of State of East Indonesia rejoined Indonesia.

Formation of Gorontalo province
Before Gorontalo became a province of its own, the Gorontalo region was part of the North Sulawesi Province with a regency status. However on 5 December 2000, in accordance to Article 38 Year 2000, Gorontalo Regency became a separate province with the name Gorontalo Province. The Ministry of Home Affairs at that time, Soerjadi Soedirdja officiate the Gorontalo Province and appointed Tursandi Alwi as the governor. A year later, Fadel Muhammad was elected as the first governor of Gorontalo Province.

Language
The Gorontalo language is a member of the Austronesian language family. Apart from Gorontalo, there are several languages that are similar which are considered by linguists as Gorontalo dialects, including Suwawa, Atinggola, Limboto, Kwandang, Tilamuta, and Sumawata. Gorontalo is widely used in contemporary society due to the influence of the Gorontalo Kingdom that was once established in the region. Atinggola is used by the Atinggola community situated on the northern coast of Gorontalo.

Today, Gorontalo itself have gone through assimilation with Manado Malay, which is also widely spoken by Gorontaloans. In terms of linguistics, Gorontalo is related to other languages from North Sulawesi and the Philippines. Gorontalo along with Mongondow are classified by linguists as being part of the Gorontalo–Mongondow languages, which are part of the wider Philippine languages grouping. The Philippine languages, which are linguistically close to Gorontalo, include Tagalog, Cebuano, Hiligaynon, Bikol, and Waray.
Today, Gorontalo is more often written using the Latin alphabet; however, the use of Gorontalo as a written language is limited. In schools for education, the media, and official documents, Indonesian is more used.

Religion
Most Gorontaloans claim adherence to the Islamic faith. By the early 16th century, most Gorontaloan adopted Islam via Ternate influence. There are numerous traditional customs of the Gorontalo people that also contain Islamic influences. 

Customs are regarded as an honor, norms and even as a guideline to implementing governance for the Gorontalo community. This is attributed to the expression of "Adat Bersendi Sara" and "Sara Bersendi Kitabullah". The meaning of these sayings is that customs (adat) are implemented based on rules (sara), while these rules must be based on the Islamic holy book, the Quran. Therefore it is understood that the lives of the Gorontalo people are full of religious values and noble values.

During the end of Ramadan, the people conducted Tombbilotohe; a cultural celebration with oil lamps, which is lit around mosques and settlements.

Culture

The Gorontalo community have a high social sense, so much so that there is hardly any conflict among themselves. A tight knitted kinship system is always preserved by the Gorontalo community, as exemplified in the Pohala'a family bond system. Mutual cooperation or huyula tradition is preserved in the daily lives of the community, and every issues will be solved through discussion.

Gorontalo people have a philosophy of life, namely, batanga pomaya, nyawa podungalo, harata potom bulu meaning, "the body is to defend the homeland, faithful to the end, wealth brings social problems" and lo iya lo ta uwa, ta uwa loloiya, boodila polucia hi lawo which means, "a leader is full of authority, but it's not arbitrary".

Traditional attires are multicolored, with each of the colors represent its symbolic aspect. Gorontalo people are also famous for their developed musical culture.

Socio-economics
The main traditional occupation of the Gorontalo people has long been agriculture. Gorontaloans plays an important part in forestry, agriculture and fishery industries. Crafting and livestock farms are secondary means of income.

In the past, there were large extensions of extended family who could carry out joint agricultural farming in mountainous region that requires a lot of soil cultivating work. The elderly father and mother are regarded as the main hosts, which is reflected in the Gorontalo language. It has not adopted a variety of intimate forms of addressing to parents and older relatives.

Architecture
The main type of Gorontalo settlement are the villages. The traditional house is called Dulohupa, consists of a frame structure built on stilts. It is built with choice timber and its roofing is made of straws. The house is then divided into several rooms. By the entrance are two staircases. In the past, Dulohupa is usually used to carry out discussions by the royal rulers. Traditional Dulohupa house can still be found in several sub-districts in Gorontalo.

Apart from Dulohupa, there is another traditional Gorontalo house called, Bandayo Poboide. However the existence of the Bandayo Poboide is almost extinct throughout the entire region of Gorontalo. One of the very few remaining Bandayo Poboide is situated in front of the Gorontalo Regent's office at Jenderal Sudirman Road, Limboto, Gorontalo.

Literature
Lumadu is a type of native Gorontalo oral literature in the form of brain exercising riddles and metaphors or parables. Lumadu if often used by children for games, while metaphoric Lumadu is often used in conversations among adults with the purpose to show courtesy for others, to broaden the conversation with others and to bring value into the subject of the conversation.

Folk dance
One of the cultural art form of the Gorontalo people is the Polopalo dance. This traditional dance is popular among the Gorontalo community, and even as far as North Sulawesi region.

Local traditions
There are several traditional customs from the Gorontalo community, among them:

 Momonto and Modutu wedding customs. In the traditional wedding customs of the Gorontalo people, there are few regulations and procedures that must be carried out by both of the bride and bridegroom. Gorontalo people still hold onto the generational traditions as part of their customs and culture. The wedding ceremony is carried out alternately in both of the house of the bride and bridegroom. The wedding ceremony can last for more than two days. Relatives will work collectively in preparing the wedding ceremony for a few days prior to the wedding day. Both of the bride and bridegroom will dress in the traditional attire, Bili’u. The bridal bedroom is used during the wedding reception in accordance to the Gorontalo customs.
 Molontalo or Tontalo (Seventh Month Ceremony), is a customary ceremony as an expression of gratitude once a pregnancy period reaches the seventh month. In holding this customary event, both of the unborn child's parents must put on traditional Gorontalo attire. A little girl will be carried by the prospective father, circling the house and finally enters the house into the room to meet his pregnant wife. After the prospective father and the little girl meets the pregnant wife, a string made of coconut leaf that was tied around the pregnant wife previously will be severed. In this Tontalo ceremony seven dishes are served on seven different trays and then these foods are distributed among the invited guests.

References

External links 

Ethnic groups in Indonesia
Central Sulawesi
Gorontalo (province)
North Sulawesi
Muslim communities of Indonesia